Showbox is a South Korean film production and distribution company.

Showbox may also refer to:

ShowBox, an Indian music channel
Showbox.com, a video streaming and download platform
The Showbox, a music venue in Seattle